Edward David Harris (30 August 1911 – 2 October 1993) was a member of the Queensland Legislative Assembly.

Biography
Harris was born at Brisbane, Queensland, the son of the Alfred Edward Harris and his wife Elizabeth Roxborough (née Smith). He was educated at Goodna, Wynnum, and Sherwood state schools. He joined the RAAF in 1940 and served in the 24th and 75th Squadrons, being discharged in 1945 with the rank of sergeant. On his return to Australia he worked as a clothing manufacturer at Manly, specializing in men's and boys wear.

On 20 May 1942, Harris married Marion Miller Morrison and together had a beautiful daughter, also named Marion, and a son. He died at the Gold Coast in October 1993.

Public life
Harris, for the Labor Party, won the seat of Wynnum at the 1966 Queensland state election taking over the seat from the retiring Bill Gunn. He was defeated in 1974 by Bill Lamond of the Country Party.

References

Members of the Queensland Legislative Assembly
1920 births
1993 deaths
Australian Labor Party members of the Parliament of Queensland
20th-century Australian politicians